Jacob ben Reuben was a Spanish rabbi and polemicist of the twelfth century. In response to attacks by the convert Petrus Alphonsi, he wrote the Sefer Milhamot Adonai or Milhamoth ha-Shem ("Book of the Wars of the Lord"). This work was divided into twelve chapters, and contained, besides refutations of the Christian arguments drawn from the Tanakh, a thorough criticism of the Gospels and the Acts of the Apostles, in which he points out many apparent contradictions.

12th-century rabbis in al-Andalus
Jewish biblical scholars